Lemonade Mouth is a soundtrack album by Bridgit Mendler and other members of cast of the film of the same name, released on April 12, 2011, by Walt Disney Records. The soundtrack peaked at number 4 on the US Billboard 200, number three on the US Top Digital Albums and topped the US Top Soundtracks and US Kid Albums. Elsewhere, it peaked at number 71 in Australia, number 38 in Austria, number 25 in Belgium (Flanders), number 100 in Belgium (Wallonia), number 79 in Netherlands, number 26 in Poland and at number 38 in Spain. In the 2011 year-end charts, the soundtrack ranked at number 87 on the US Billboard 200, number 7 on the US Top Soundtracks and managed to make it into the top 3 of the US Kid Albums. The singles "Somebody", "Determinate" and "Breakthrough" peaked at number 89, 51 and 88 on the US Billboard Hot 100. As of September 2012, the soundtrack had sold 402,000 copies.

Album history
The Lemonade Mouth pop rock album includes ten original songs by songwriters Aris Archontis, Maria Christensen, Ali Dee, Andy Dodd, Tom Leonard, Jeannie Lurie, Niclas Molinder, Chen Neeman, Joacim Persson, Lindy Robbins, Shridhar Solanki, Shane Stevens, Matthew Tishler, Bryan Todd, Reed Vertelney, Adam Watts, and Adam Hicks. The soundtrack was released by Walt Disney Records on April 12, 2011.

Singles 
"Somebody", performed by Bridgit Mendler, was released as first single on March 4, 2011. It has debuted and peaked at number 89 on the US Billboard Hot 100 and peaked at number 12 on the US Billboard Top Heatseekers chart. The music video was released on March 18, 2011. The song has sold 6,000 copies in the first week in the United States according to Nielsen SoundScan.

"Determinate" was the second single. The song is performed by Mendler featured the Adam Hicks's vocals. It was released on April 15, 2011. The song proved the most successful out of the three singles, peaking at number 51 on the US Billboard Hot 100, at number 28 on the US Hot Digital Songs, topped the US Billboard Top Heatseekers chart and charting in 2 more countries. The music video was released on the same day the song was released and is a scene of the film.

"Breakthrough", performed by the cast of the film, was the third and final single. It was released on May 2, 2011. The song debuted and peaked at number 88 on the US Billboard Hot 100 and peaked at number 89 on the US Billboard Top Heatseekers chart. The music video is another scene of the film.

Other charted songs
"Turn Up the Music", performed by Bridgit Mendler, did not enter the Billboard Hot 100, but peaked at number 12 on the Bubbling Under Hot 100 Singles.

"She's So Gone", performed by Naomi Scott, also peaked on the Bubbling Under Hot 100 Singles at number 3.

Critical reception 

Christopher Monger of Allmusic gave a review: Based on author Mark Peter Hughes' 2007 novel of the same name, Disney's Lemonade Mouth follows the exploits of five disgruntled Arizona teens who bond during a stint in detention and end up starting a band—it's kind of like The Breakfast Club with a battle of the bands at the end. With 11 original songs that span teen pop, pop punk, hip hop, and rock, Lemonade Mouth (the band) tackle the usual teen subjects (self-esteem, standing by your friends in the face of adversity, following your dreams, being silly) and successfully blend the dewy-eyed romanticism of the Jonas Brothers and the quasi-rebellious angst of early Avril Lavigne, resulting in a winning, if not entirely original, collection of new High School Musical-inspired homeroom anthems.

Commercial performance 
The soundtrack debuted at number 18 on the US Billboard 200. Due to strong sales, the soundtrack moved up thirteen places to reach the top five spot. Then the soundtrack finally peaked at number 4. It has also peaked at number three on the US Top Digital Albums and has topped the US Top Soundtracks and US Kid Albums. Elsewhere, it has peaked at number 71 on the Australian Albums Chart, number 38 on the Austrian Albums Chart, number 25 on the Belgian Albums Chart (Flanders), number 100 on the Belgian Albums Chart (Wallonia), number 79 on the Netherlands Albums Chart, number 26 on the Polish Albums Chart and at number 38 on the Spanish Albums Chart. As of September 2012, the soundtrack has sold 402,000 copies.

Track listing 
Credits adapted from Apple Music

Charts

Sales

Year-end charts

References 

2011 soundtrack albums
Pop rock soundtracks
Hip hop soundtracks
Walt Disney Records soundtracks
Bridgit Mendler albums
Drama film soundtracks
Pop punk albums
Teen pop albums